Mailand is a hamlet in the Shetland Islands.

It is on the island of Unst, the northernmost of the inhabited British Isles, near its southern coast.

External links 

Villages in Unst